Jocelyn  is a 1952 French historical drama film directed by Jacques de Casembroot and starring Jean Desailly, Simone Valère and Jean Vilar. It is set during the French Revolution. It is based on the 1836 novel of the same title by Alphonse de Lamartine, which had previously been made into a 1933 film.

The film's sets were designed by the art director Raymond Nègre.

Cast
 Jean Desailly as Jocelyn 
 Simone Valère as Laurence 
 Jean Vilar as Le supérieur du nouveau séminaire 
 Nicole Berger as Julie, la soeur de Jocelyn 
 Jean Debucourt as Le parrain de Julie 
 Yvette Etiévant as Soeur Louise 
 Alexandre Rignault as Le berger 
 André Carnège as Le supérieur de l'ancien séminaire 
 Germaine de France
 Étienne Aubray
 Gérard Buhr
 Marguerite Cavadasky
 Guy Favières
 Christian Melsen
 Albert Michel
 Roger Rafal
 Guy Rapp
 Jean-Michel Rouzière
 Georges Sellier

References

Bibliography
 Hayward, Susan. French Costume Drama of the 1950s: Fashioning Politics in Film. Intellect Books, 2010.

External links

1952 films
1950s French-language films
Remakes of French films
Films directed by Jacques de Casembroot
1950s historical drama films
French historical drama films
Films set in the 18th century
1952 drama films
French black-and-white films
1950s French films